Charles Trotter (September 8, 1959 – November 5, 2013) was an American chef and restaurateur. His most well-known restaurant, Charlie Trotter's, was open in Chicago from 1987 to 2012.

Early life and education
Trotter was born in Wilmette, Illinois and graduated from New Trier High School in Winnetka, Illinois. He  attended Southern Illinois University in Carbondale, Illinois from 1977 to 1979, and then transferred to University of Wisconsin–Madison. Trotter started cooking professionally in 1982 after earning a political science bachelor's degree from UW–Madison.

Career
For five years after college, he worked and studied in Chicago, San Francisco (at the California Culinary Academy), Florida and Europe.   He opened his first restaurant in Chicago with his father, Bob Trotter, as his partner.

Trotter was the host of the 1999 PBS cooking show The Kitchen Sessions with Charlie Trotter, in which he details his recipes and cooking techniques. He likened cooking to an improvisational jazz session in that as two riffs will never be the same, so too with food. He also wrote 14 cookbooks and three management books, and promoted a line of organic and all-natural gourmet foods distributed nationally.

Trotter was involved with his philanthropic Charlie Trotter Culinary Education Foundation and other causes. He was awarded the Humanitarian of the Year award in 2005 by the International Association of Culinary Professionals. He invited groups of public high school students into his restaurant as part of his Excellence Program two to three times per week: after eating a meal, the students were told how the food was prepared and the motivations of those preparing it.

Trotter also was unusual among celebrity chefs for his outspokenness in matters of ethics, most famously when he  took foie gras off the menu in 2002 for ethical reasons. However, Trotter refused to be associated with the animal rights group Farm Sanctuary stating, "These people are idiots. Understand my position: I have nothing to do with a group like that. I think they're pathetic. … [S]ome of their tactics are crude and uncivilized even."

Trotter made a cameo appearance in the 1997 film My Best Friend's Wedding, screaming at an assistant, "I will kill your whole family if you don't get this right! I need this perfect!" a parody of a stereotypical screaming angry chef.

Restaurants

 Charlie Trotter's restaurant in Chicago opened in 1987. It was named as the 30th-best restaurant in the world by Restaurant Magazine, and 5th-best in the United States in 2007. In 2010 Charlie Trotter's was one of three restaurants in Chicago to be awarded two stars by the Michelin Guide. In the following year's Michelin Guide, the restaurant again was rated with two stars. On December 31, 2011, Trotter announced that the restaurant would close in August 2012, citing a desire to travel and to pursue a master's degree.

 Trotter also owned Trotter's To Go at 1337 W. Fullerton, a high-end delicatessen and catering store in Lincoln Park, Chicago. This closed in July 2012.
 In 2008, Trotter opened his second namesake restaurant in Las Vegas known as Restaurant Charlie. The restaurant garnered extraordinary praise from critics and received the Michelin Guide One Star award in 2009. The restaurant also received the 2009 James Beard Award for "Best New Restaurant". Within the restaurant was a smaller, private bar known as Bar Charlie in which diners were seated overlooking the kitchen preparation and received a hands-on experience. It closed in March 2010.
 In 2004, Trotter opened C, a seafood restaurant in Los Cabos, Mexico. It closed in  November 2008.
 Trotter had planned to open a restaurant in New York City in a new building being built at One Madison Park, but a foreclosure crisis prevented it.
In 2014, Trotter's son Dylan and his mother Dona-Lee Trotter announced that the nonprofit Trotter Project would open in the original Charlie Trotter's restaurant space on Armitage Avenue. Though the buildings had been put on the market after the restaurant closed in 2012, they were taken off the market. The project is expected to include teaching opportunities for young chefs.

Lawsuits
Trotter was the subject of a number of lawsuits. In 2003 he was the subject of two class action lawsuits pertaining to the compensation of his employees and alleged violations of labor law, both front-of-the-house (service) and back-of-the-house (cooks). The first, filed by former waiter Kurt Sorensen, alleges that rather than receiving the tips they collected, waiters were paid from a restaurant-wide pool, and their share was significantly lower than the amount they had collected, in violation of minimum wage law. This suit was settled out of court. The second, filed September 17, 2003 by former cook Beverly Kim, alleged that cooks were required to work unpaid overtime. This suit was settled in 2005, resulting in a liability of almost $700,000, though of this only about $300,000 was paid out, as many eligible former employees returned their share.

On June 13, 2013, Trotter was sued by Bekim and Ilir Frrokaj, two wine-collecting brothers, who accused him of selling them a counterfeit  bottle of 1945 Domaine de la Romanée-Conti for $46,000; Trotter denied any wrongdoing.

Personal life
Trotter married his first wife, Lisa Ehrlich, on August 31, 1986. They met in 1981 at University of Wisconsin-Madison. Lisa helped open the restaurant and served as its first dining room manager and wine director until the couple divorced in August 1990.

Trotter's second marriage, to Lynn Thomas, produced a son, Dylan, who was 21 or 22 years old at his father's death.

In February 2010, Trotter married girlfriend Rochelle Smith, who later became his publicist.

In 2021, a feature-length documentary about his life, titled Love, Charlie: The Rise and Fall of Chef Charlie Trotter, was released in the United States.

Death and legacy
On November 5, 2013, Trotter's son Dylan found him unconscious in his Lincoln Park home. Trotter was taken to Northwestern Memorial Hospital, where he was pronounced dead  as a result of a stroke. Former understudy Graham Elliot called Trotter a "mentor, trailblazer, philosopher, artist, teacher [and] leader."
Charlie Trotter's spirit of mentorship continues via The Trotter Project, a 501(c)(3) charitable organization created by  family, co-workers and friends including Homaro Cantu, Trotter's mother Dona-Lee, sister Anne, brothers Scott and Tom, and his son Dylan.

Published works
 Charlie Trotter's 1994 
 Charlie Trotter's Vegetables 1996 
 Charlie Trotter's Seafood 1997 
 Gourmet Cooking for Dummies 1997 
 Charlie Trotter's Desserts 1998 
 The Kitchen Sessions With Charlie Trotter 1999 
 Charlie Trotter Cooks at Home 2000 
 Charlie Trotter's Meat and Game 2001 
 Workin' More Kitchen Sessions With Charlie Trotter 2004 
 Homecooking with Charlie Trotter 2009

Coauthored
 Clarke, Paul and Charlie Trotter. Lessons in Excellence from Charlie Trotter 1999 
 Lawler, Edmund and Charlie Trotter. Lessons in Service from Charlie Trotter 2001 
 Trotter, Charlie and Roxanne Klein. Raw 2003 
 Trotter, Wareing, Hill and Hall. Knife Skills in the Kitchen 2008

Awards and honors

 Culinary Hall of Fame

See also

 List of American restaurateurs

References

External links

 Interview with Charlie Trotter
 Charlie Trotter in His Prime: A Feature From September 1997

1959 births
2013 deaths
Chefs from Chicago
American male chefs
American restaurateurs
Businesspeople from Chicago
California Culinary Academy alumni
Head chefs of Michelin starred restaurants
James Beard Foundation Award winners
New Trier High School alumni
University of Wisconsin–Madison College of Letters and Science alumni
Writers from Chicago
20th-century American businesspeople